Leonard Lindsey Henderson (January 22, 1901 – March 1979), sometimes listed as "Lenon", was an American Negro league third baseman in the 1930s.

A native of Hamilton County, Tennessee, Henderson was the older brother of fellow Negro leaguer Henry Henderson. He made his Negro leagues debut in 1930 with the Nashville Elite Giants, played for Nashville again in 1932, and also spent time with the Louisville Black Caps and Birmingham Black Barons. Henderson died in Jackson, Mississippi in 1979 at age 78.

References

External links
 and Seamheads

1901 births
1979 deaths
Date of death missing
Birmingham Black Barons players
Louisville Black Caps players
Nashville Elite Giants players
Baseball third basemen
Baseball players from Tennessee
People from Hamilton County, Tennessee
20th-century African-American sportspeople